Netechma nigralba is a species of moth of the family Tortricidae. It is found in Ecuador in the provinces of Morona-Santiago and Loja.

References

Moths described in 2001
Netechma
Moths of South America
Taxa named by Józef Razowski